.hack//Roots is a 26-episode anime series, animated by studio Bee Train, that sets as a prologue for the .hack//G.U.  video games. It is the first .hack  TV series broadcast in HDTV (1080i). It is set seven years after the events of the first two anime series and games. .hack//Roots revolves around an MMORPG game called The World R:2, also known as The World Revision:2 and serves a sequel to the original version of "The World". Its original Japanese television run aired from April 5, 2006 through September 27, 2006.

Plot
".hack//Roots" follows the tale of Haseo, a black 'Adept Rogue'(a class that can use multiple types of weapons) and member of the "Twilight Brigade", a small guild created within "The World R:2." In the year 2015, the CC Corporation's building burned down, and with it, most of the existing data for "The World." By splicing in data from what would have potentially been another game with what remained of "The World" after the fire, CC Corp. created "The World R:2" and released it in 2016, which is when the anime takes place. The main revisions in this release were that the game allowed for guild and PvP (player vs player) play.

Haseo logs into The World R:2 for the first time and falls victim to the PKers (player-killers) that reside within the game. He is saved by Ovan, who prompts him to join the Twilight Brigade alongside Sakisaka, Tabby and Shino, who are in search of finding "The Key of the Twilight." However, a popular guild named "TaN" obstructs the Twilight Brigade in its mission and is attempting to obtain Ovan's unique character data. The Twilight Brigade has discovered special items, known as 'Virus Cores', and believed them to be the path to finding "The Key of the Twilight" and went to find them all. Once the Twilight Brigade had acquired all 6 cores, the guild headed out to use them in one of the "Lost Ground"s, after figuring out that the two were connected to one another.

However, the group discovers that this was all a trap laid by the members of TaN in order to capture Ovan. With Ovan gone and no sign of the Key of the Twilight, the Twilight Brigade disband and previous members, such as B-set and Gord, quit the game entirely. Soon after, Shino is killed within the game by a mysterious PKer named "Tri-Edge". This somehow puts her into a coma in the real world, which devastates Haseo. Haseo then begins training in order to get strong enough to defeat Tri-Edge and save Shino from her real-life coma. Through this ordeal, Haseo becomes obsessed with power and ends up as a Player-Killer-Killer(PKK), in an effort to find information on Tri-edge. When Haseo competes in a special event that promises a special reward, he gains a new power, but his mind is corrupted and he begins to kill PKers with yet more aggression, gaining him the title of "The Terror of Death."

Characters

Voiced by: Takahiro Sakurai (Japanese); Andrew Francis (English, Bandai Visual dub), David Lee McKinney (English, Animax Asia dub)
The protagonist of the series, and a newbie within The World R:2. Haseo had an encounter with PKers (Player Killers) before joining the Twilight Brigade. He appears to be obsessed with Ovan's enigmatic nature, which he soon discovers isn't so unusual. He is an outsider in real life, and not very good at dealing with people. He seems to care for Shino in a more than platonic way. After Shino goes into a coma, Haseo starts to become extremely depressed and also very angry whenever Shino or Tri-Edge are mentioned. He completed a special event known as The Forest of Pain, which was said to be impossible to complete. His reward was an upgrade that gave him impossible strength (known as the 3rd form in .hack//G.U.). He is now trying to hunt down Tri-Edge, using his newly gained power status to PK players in an attempt to find information. After his transformation he becomes even more mentally unstable and anti-social. While trying to find information on Tri-Edge, Haseo reunites with Ovan who tells him that he will find Tri-Edge at the Hulle Granz Cathedral (one of the Lost Grounds). Haseo fights Tri-Edge but is defeated and stripped of all his power and equipment, ironically returning him mostly to his senses as well. Outside of the game, Haseo is 17 years old and attends a private high school. He lives alone. Haseo visits Shino in the hospital on a daily basis after she fell in a coma.

Voiced by: Ryosei Konishi (Japanese); Michael Kopsa (English)
The Guildmaster of the Twilight Brigade, Ovan has a strange device sealed around his left arm. He is an enigma to those who know him. Many people think he is odd, due in large part to his search for the Key of the Twilight, an item that may not exist. He is often searching for information on the Key of the Twilight, and is almost never seen around town. Apparently, Ovan's PC data is as large as an entire field, which may be due to the fact that it contains the black matter, the material that make up AIDAs that possess PCs, or possibly the epitaph of Corbenik, the last of the Eight Phases.  The data is apparently mostly in his left arm, in which Naobi had unlocked upon capturing him. After the incident, Ovan somehow escapes, not returning until much later in the series. He has also contacted or ran-into Taihaku, the reasons for this are unknown, but it may be connected to his wish to make Haseo stronger. He encountered Azure Kite, and defeated him leaving one witness.

Voiced by: Kaori Nazuka (Japanese); Kelly Sheridan (English, Bandai Visual dub)
One of the few people close to Ovan who acts as leader of the Twilight Brigade whenever Ovan is incapable of doing so. Gentle-mannered but strong-minded, she holds the Twilight Brigade together during Ovan's frequent absences. She and Ovan seem to have a more involved relationship than mere guildmates, as they have both known and seen each other somewhat frequently outside the game as it was alluded to when Shino asked about Ovan's doctor visits. During episode 13 Shino is attacked by Tri-Edge and Azure Kite is framed, resulting in her PC seemingly erased and her real self sent into a coma. She had been living alone and her landlord discovered her unconscious. The doctors cannot treat her because they do not know the cause behind her coma. Those who have suffered fates like hers are referred to as a Lost One, since it is rumored that once PKed by Tri-Edge a player can never return to the game. In real life, Shino is 18 and studying medicine.

Voiced by: Ryotaru Okiayu (Japanese); Alistair Abell (English, Bandai Visual dub)
Sakisaka left another guild to join the Twilight Brigade and was a member during its previous incarnation, he often helps beginners like Haseo and a lot more with Tabby to level up. He is skeptical that the Key of the Twilight even exists and often complains that the Twilight Brigade's search is meaningless. He quit the Twilight Brigade after Ovan's disappearance, assuming Ovan had stolen the Key of the Twilight for himself, and formed a Guild with Tabby, but as of episode 13, Sakisaka has quit the game and gone to another called Riot Gun. In real life he lives in a small apartment and is 19.

Voiced by: Megumi Toyoguchi (Japanese); Maryke Hendrikse (English, Bandai Visual dub), Sarah Hauser (Animax Asia dub)
As her name implies, Tabby somewhat resembles a cat, with feline ears, claws, and hair that acts like a cat's tail. Her weapon of choice is a pair of large cat paws that she uses to slash at enemies. Tabby has been playing about as long as Haseo and usually fights alongside Sakisaka in the field. She often refers to Sakisaka as her "master" or "teacher." She is loyal, friendly and positive (though she points out that she's not cheerful because she wants to be). She has quit the Brigade alongside Sakisaka. Unlike Sakisaka, she has yet to quit the game, opting to try to help Haseo instead. She momentarily caught Yata and Pi's attention, though Saburo doubted she was ever particularly special. Kuhn offered her a place in Canard which she denied. Yata and Pi still seem to feel that Tabby has some untold role to play, despite being a seemingly ordinary player. Tabby created a Guild, under Tohta's guidance, known as the Paw Brigade, which was set up to heal both Haseo and PCs defeated by Haseo.

Voiced by: Takumi Yamazaki (Japanese); Paul Dobson (English, Bandai Visual dub)
The mysterious former Guildmaster of TaN. Naobi appears to be obsessed with Ovan's search for the Key of the Twilight or rather Ovan himself, though his motives is unknown. He and Ovan seem to go way back, although precisely how far is unknown. Naobi was the one who first told Ovan about the Key of the Twilight. Naobi appears as a large dark blue cat creature. After capturing Ovan to analyze his PC, his illegal activities were reported by Shino over what had happened with Ovan, and he was forced to abandon Naobi, which turns out to be nothing more than a PC to hide his true identity, and now controls Yata; meaning Naobi was a System-Administrator. He and Pi are keeping tabs on Haseo as well as waiting for any strange activity to take place in The World.

Voiced by: Kenta Miyake (Japanese); Mark Acheson (English, Bandai Visual dub)
The figurehead and finance treasurer of TaN. Tawaraya is a college student who is planning to study abroad. He acts very business-like while playing and appears to deal in items and information through TaN. His account has been terminated or suspended due to TaN's illegal activities but he has since come back with a new PC known as Tohta in order to take care of unfinished business before leaving. Both his PC's names were connected to a historical figure known as Tawara no Tohta. He disliked the recent practice of 'Real-Money Trading' within The World and managed to get Yata to have The World's administration to delete or suspend PCs that were doing so within the game. He has since accepted to inform Wool and Cashmere of Tabby's whereabouts, as well as offered to collect information on Tri-Edge for Haseo.

Voiced by: Sanae Kobayashi (Japanese); Lisa Ann Beley (English, Bandai Visual dub)
A PK and the former head of TaN's 'black ops'.  She acts as the enemy, as well as stalker, of the Twilight Brigade on Naobi's orders and assists him in his illegal activities. Little is known about her motives but she seems to plan on taking the Key of the Twilight for herself, or so it seems. She seems to take pleasure in hunting down members of the Twilight Brigade and PK them after shaking them down for information. After assisting in Naobi's capture of Ovan's PC, she was made an outlaw like him and was forced to use her administrative PC: Pi. She has a contact named Saburo; a former member of TaN that worked under her. Pi keeps an eye on players such as Haseo and Tabby, and sends Saburo in her stead to keep herself unnoticed, as well as have observation surveillance done on Haseo.

Voiced by: Junpei Takiguchi (Japanese); Russell Roberts (English, Bandai Visual dub)
Phyllo does not belong to any Guild and is unusually old for someone playing The World R:2. He is an U-zoku character and is almost always seen floating in midair. He acts as a mine of information for Haseo, having connections with numerous influential PCs, including Ovan, Naobi and Taihaku. Phyllo likes to hang out in town and does not venture out into the fields often. Despite this, his character is strong and he can hold his ground against melee players. It was Phyllo who introduced Shino to Ovan. He was attacked by Azure Kite in episode 14, but then later backed off after realising that Phyllo was not Ovan, who he was looking for and had been at the same area as Phyllo only seconds earlier. Phyllo is also the only one to have survived an attack by Tri-Edge without suffering any side-effects to himself or his PC. Later on, this catches Pi and Yata's interest. It was stated during Yata's interrogation of Phyllo that he met a female PC who introduced him to Ovan, though her identity is unknown, however it is stated that it was Aina, Ovan's younger sister.

Episodes
.hack//Roots has 26 episodes and aired on TV Tokyo.  The final episode was broadcast on September 27, 2006. In North America, the series started airing on Saturday, November 11, 2006 at 5:00am EST on Cartoon Network, with no prior advertising or announcements given whatsoever. Due to the last few episodes containing spoilers for games not yet released in North America, Cartoon Network chose to restart the series at Episode #1 after only 21 episodes were broadcast, leaving the last five unaired. Starting July 6, 2007, Adult Swim took over Friday nights, leaving the show nowhere to be seen on the schedule and the remaining episodes were never aired.  All 26 episodes have been dubbed, however. The anime was licensed by Bandai Entertainment with dubbing handled by The Ocean Group based out of Vancouver, British Columbia, Canada. Following the closure of Bandai Entertainment, Funimation announced at SDCC 2013, that they have acquired 4 .hack title including Roots.

Music

Singles
Silly-Go-Round Single was released on May 10, 2006. It contains the opening theme Silly-Go-Round along with the song Angel Gate. Lyrics, composition and arrangement were done by Yuki Kajiura was performed by FictionJunction Yuuka

	 	

Boukoku Kakusei Catharsis Single was an album single by ALI PROJECT and was released on 2006. The song was composed by Mikiya Katakura and lyrics were done by Arika Takarano.

Original soundtracks

There are currently two soundtracks released for .hack//Roots called .hack//Roots OST I & .hack//Roots OST II.

.hack//Roots OST I track list

.hack//Roots OST II track list

Reception
Chris Beveridge of Mania gave the series a B+.

References
Specific

General
 Yuki, Masahiro. "The Official Art of .hack//Roots". Newtype USA. 6 (5) pp. 101–107. . .

External links

 TV Tokyo's .hack//Roots Official website 

Roots
2006 Japanese television series debuts
2006 Japanese television series endings
Bandai Entertainment anime titles
Bee Train Production
Bandai Visual
Funimation